Realm of Nauga is an adventure game for the TRS-80 Color Computer released on cassette as part of Chromasettes August 1982 issue, then available at RadioShack.

Plot

The objective of Realm of Nauga is for the player to traverse three levels of dense forest to retrieve the Magic Golden Scepter for King Thomas II. In exchange for the Scepter, King Thomas promises one-quarter of his kingdom as reward. The player is warned that retrieving the Scepter will not be easy, as several monsters of increasing difficulty will be encountered along the way. To reach each successive level of forest, the player must find a doorway and the key that unlocks it. Throughout the player's journey several objects will aid in the quest, including a sword, a bow, arrows, magic potions, health potions, a rope to traverse trees, and a boat to cross water. After crossing the first two levels of the forest, the player will encounter the most difficult challenge of all: the Nauga.

The Nauga is an immortal creature, but it may be stunned to buy time for the adventurer. It will relentlessly pursue the player until the player dies or completes the quest. The Nauga possesses powerful magic and can transport itself instantly to whichever section of the forest the player is currently exploring. It also shoots with magic power, severely decreasing the health of the adventurer. Along with this magic power, the Nauga also has a bite that is equally debilitating. As powerful as the Nauga is, it is possible for the adventurer to shelter in the trees or on the water, provided the rope or the boat has been found.

If the adventurer finds the Magic Golden Scepter in the third forest and retrieves the key to the final doorway without being devoured by the Nauga, the player will win the game.

Gameplay

User interface
Nauga uses the standard Color Computer 32x16 character display with green background. Objects and creatures are represented on screen by single characters, sometimes using inverse video mode. Geographic features, such as trees and rivers, are represented using the CoCo's 8-color graphics support in the standard text mode.

Each level of forest spans several different screens laid out in a 4x3 grid, with each section of forest numbered 1-12 so that the player can determine the present location. The layout of the forest has finite boundaries and does not allow the adventurer to travel across non-adjacent sections of forest. The player can however use magic to randomly jump to other sections of forest. This use of magic is unpredictable; sometimes the adventurer simply transports to a different location within the same section of forest.

The game exploits the CoCo's processor clock rate doubling, activated by the "POKE 65495,0" command, and deactivated it after a normal exit. Players who reflexively hit the Break key when death seems imminent, prematurely terminating the game, are treated to an unusually rapid flashing color cursor at the OK prompt.

Movement

Nauga is not turn-based; creatures move independent of the timing of user input. The player moves his character with the joystick and picks up objects by pressing the joystick button. The player uses the keyboard to perform additional tasks, pressing '1' to use the sword, '2' to use the bow and arrow, '3' to use magic, '4' to show the status report, and '0' to use a healing potion.

Combat
During combat, the adventurer can employ several attacks dependent on items held in inventory. If the adventurer is equipped with a sword, the player can attack monsters within the one or two cells adjacent to the current position. If the adventurer uses the bow and arrow, the player can fire a shot that seeks out the closest monster. The bow and arrow is limited by line-of-sight targeting and cannot shoot through trees. The player's third offensive option is use of magic that temporarily immobilizes the affected monster. Due to the unpredictability of magic, it is never a guaranteed strategy.

A common strategy during combat is to use the rope or boat if the adventurer has them in inventory. With these two items, the player can hide on the edge of trees or on the water and shoot arrows, or use the sword to attack adjacent monsters.

References 

1982 video games
Adventure games
TRS-80 Color Computer games
TRS-80 Color Computer-only games
Video games developed in the United States